Abu Musab al-Zarqawi (Father of Musab, from Zarqa; ; October 30, 1966 – June 7, 2006), born Ahmad Fadeel al-Nazal al-Khalayleh, was a Jordanian jihadist who ran a terrorist training camp in Afghanistan. He became known after going to Iraq and being responsible for a series of bombings, beheadings, and attacks during the Iraq War, reportedly "turning an insurgency against US troops" in Iraq "into a Shia–Sunni civil war". He was sometimes known by his supporters as the "Sheikh of the slaughterers".

He formed Jama'at al-Tawhid wal-Jihad in 1999, and led it until his death in June 2006. Zarqawi took responsibility, on several audio and video recordings, for numerous acts of violence in Iraq including suicide bombings and hostage executions. Zarqawi opposed the presence of U.S. and Western military forces in the Islamic world, as well as the West's support for the existence of Israel. In late 2004 he joined al-Qaeda, and pledged allegiance to Osama bin Laden. After this al-Tawhid wal-Jihad became known as Tanzim Qaidat al-Jihad fi Bilad al-Rafidayn, also known as al-Qaeda in Iraq (AQI), and al-Zarqawi was given the al-Qaeda title "Emir of Al Qaeda in the Country of Two Rivers".

In September 2005, he declared "all-out war" on Shi'ites in Iraq, after the Iraqi government offensive on insurgents in the Sunni town of Tal Afar. He dispatched numerous suicide bombers throughout Iraq to attack American soldiers and areas with large concentrations of Shia militias. He is also thought to be responsible for the 2005 bombing of three hotels in Amman, Jordan. One United States Air Force F-16C jet dropped two 500-pound (230 kg) guided bombs on the safehouse.

Personal life

Early life 

Ahmad Fadeel al-Nazal al-Khalayleh, is believed to have been al-Zarqawi's real name. "Abu Musab" literally translates to "Musab's father", born in the name Ahmed al-Khalayleh to an impoverished Jordanian family in 1966. Raised in Zarqa, an industrial town located 27 kilometers (17 mi) north of Amman, with seven sisters and two brothers, and of Bedouin background, his father has been described as either a retired army officer or a practitioner of traditional medicine whose death precipitated the economic distress of the family, pushing Zarqawi to become a street thug, known for his fights, the terror he inspired, his heavy drinking and his nickname "the Green Man" because of his many tattoos.

Zarqawi is thus usually described as having been a high school dropout and a petty criminal in his youth, including, allegedly, a procurer of prostitutes.

1989–1998: Afghanistan War, returning to Jordan, jail 
In the late 1980s, Zarqawi went to Afghanistan to join the Mujahideen who were fighting the invading Soviet troops.
He arrived there in 1989, as the Soviets were already leaving. Instead of fighting, he became a reporter for an Islamist newsletter called Al-Bonian al-Marsous. On the other hand, Ahmed Hashim says that he did fight in the battles of Khost and Gardez, while the magazine, which translates as The Solid Edifice in English, was published in both Arabic and Urdu from the Hayatabad suburb of Peshawar in Pakistan, where he also met his future spiritual mentor, the influential Salafi jihadi ideologue Abu Muhammad al-Maqdisi, in 1990. It is also there that he celebrated the marriage of one of his seven sisters to Abu Qudama Salih al-Hami, a Jordanian-Palestinian journalist close to the Palestinian militant Abdullah Azzam, known for "resurrecting jihad" in modern times, because he was one-legged and he thought he couldn't find a suitable partner otherwise, while, years later, the same al-Hami would write a book entitled Fursan al-Farida al-Gha’iba (Knights of the Neglected Duty [of Jihad]), where he criticized Maqdisi's jihadi credentials after he parted ways with Zarqawi. Ultimately, he lived in Pakistan for some 10 years, mainly in and around Peshawar, and eventually became fluent in Pashto. Another sister married the Jordanian-Palestinian militant Khalid al-Aruri (alias Abu al-Qassam), "one of Zarqawi's closest lieutenants in Afghanistan", another married Haytham Mustafa Obeidat (alias Abu Hassan), "a veteran of the Afghan jihad", and yet another sister married the Jordanian Iyad Nazmi Salih Khalil (his aliases being Abu Julaybib al-Urduni and Iyad al-Tubasi), a veteran jihadi militant, who eventually would become the "third highest-ranking official" of the Al-Nusra Front in the Syrian Civil War, in 2016, before being killed in 2018.

He was recruited by Abu Qutaibah al Majali to fight in Afghanistan.

According to a report by The Washington Institute for Near East Policy, "Zarqawi's criminal past and extreme views on takfir (accusing another Muslim of heresy and thereby justifying his killing) created major friction and distrust with bin Laden when the two first met in Afghanistan in 1999."

He was arrested in Jordan after guns and explosives were found in his home and sent to prison in 1992. In prison, he attempted to draft his cell mates into joining him to overthrow the rulers of Jordan, a former prison mate told Time magazine in 2004.

According to Jordanian officials and acquaintances, Zarqawi developed a reputation as a cellblock enforcer and adopted more radical Islamic beliefs.

In prison, due to his charisma and stature, he eventually became a sort of leader, issuing fatwas (religious edicts) and calling himself "sheikh", while he also memorized the entire Qur'an.

For the Jordanian journalist Fouad Hussein, who was in jail with him, it was not the Afghan jihad but his prison years, during which he was subjected to torture, for instance causing him to lose his toenails due to infections inflicted by tortures, and at one point being put eight and half months in solitary confinement, which radicalized him : "The prison left a clear mark on al-Zarqawi's personality, which grew more intense. In his opinion, policemen, judges, and government members of all ranks were supporters of the regimes, which he believed were tawagheet [tyrants] who should be fought." He also worked on his physical training.

1999–2000: Training of Jihadists 
In 1999, Zarqawi was released from prison in a general amnesty by Jordan's King Abdullah. Within months after his release, according to Jordanian officials, Zarqawi tried to resurrect his Jund al-Sham. Then, also according to Jordanian officials, he was involved in the millennium plot—a bid to bomb the Radisson SAS Hotel in Amman (Jordan) before New Year's Day 2000.
The plot was discovered, and Zarqawi fled to Pakistan.

When Pakistan revoked his visa, he crossed into Afghanistan, where he met, still according to Jordanian officials and also German court testimony, with Osama bin Laden and other al-Qaeda leaders in Kandahar and Kabul. He asked them for assistance and money to set up his own training camp in Herat. With some "small seed money" of $200,000 from Osama bin Laden, the camp opened soon and attracted Jordanian militants. Zarqawi selected Herat, far from al-Qaeda's established operations in Kandahar and Jalalabad, because his recruits would enter Afghanistan through Iran.

That camp was either for his group Jund al-Sham—as one, indirect, source contended—or for his newly started group Jama'at al-Tawhid wal-Jihad—as the Washington Institute for Near East Policy claimed—or he started one or two camps for both of those groups in Herat in 1999. It is also possible that Zarqawi set up only one camp for only one group known by those two different names in 1999. GlobalSecurity.org called it "a camp near Herat, reportedly specialised in manufacturing poisons".

2001: Resistance to U.S. invasion of Afghanistan 
In early September 2001, Zarqawi was in Iran around the same time of the 9/11 terrorist attacks in the USA.

After the October 2001 U.S.-led invasion of Afghanistan, Zarqawi returned to Afghanistan to help repel the assault by western allied forces, joining with Taliban and al-Qaida fighters. He either suffered cracked ribs following the collapse of a bombed house or, according to a Jordanian intelligence source, was wounded in the chest during a firefight, in late 2001.

He fled to Iran in December 2001 or January 5, 2002, and received medical treatment in Mashhad. The Iranian government reportedly refused Jordanian requests to extradite Zarqawi. Circumstantial evidence suggests that Iranian authorities may have restricted Zarqawi's activities to some extent.

2002: Involvement in the assassination of Laurence Foley 
The U.S. government contended (in 2003 in a U.N. speech) that Zarqawi received medical treatment in Baghdad, Iraq, from March until May 2002. About that time, Jordanian authorities asked Iraqi President Saddam Hussein to extradite Zarqawi for his suspected role in the millennium plot of 1999 (see above).

By, and during the summer of 2002, Zarqawi's location and activities appear in reports that conflict with one another. Jordanian court documents alleged that Zarqawi, during the summer of 2002, began training a band of fighters at a base in Syria, which on October 28, 2002, shot and killed Laurence Foley, a U.S. senior administrator of U.S. Agency for International Development in Amman, Jordan. Unidentified Arab intelligence sources in 2004 claimed that Zarqawi was still in Syria late in 2002 and when the U.S. and Jordan requested his extradition from Syria, Syria ignored the request. However, the U.S. would actually claim that Zarqawi was in Baghdad from May until late November 2002 in the 2006 Senate Report on Pre-war Intelligence on Iraq, until later fleeing to Iran and northeastern Iraq.

2003–2006: Terrorist activities in and around Iraq 

In February 2003, according to Arab intelligence sources, Zarqawi in eastern Iran planned military resistance to the expected U.S. invasion of Iraq. And, by March 2003, according to British intelligence, Zarqawi's network had set up sleeper cells in Baghdad to resist an expected U.S. occupation.

Prior to the US 2003 invasion of Iraq, Special Activities Division (SAD) and the Army's 10th Special Forces Group entered Iraq and cooperated with Patriotic Union of Kurdistan Peshmerga to attack Ansar al-Islam. Together they launched Operation Viking Hammer in March 2003 which dealt a huge blow to the terrorist group which resulted in the deaths of a substantial number of terrorists and the uncovering of a chemical weapons facility at Sargat. Sargat was the only facility of its type discovered in Iraq.

Over 2003–2006, Zarqawi and his group Jama'at al-Tawhid wal-Jihad (1999–2004) later called Tanzim Qaidat al-Jihad fi Bilad al-Rafidayn ('al-Qaeda in Iraq') (2004–2006) are accused of dozens of violent and deadly attacks in Iraq, which had, after the March 2003 U.S.-led invasion of Iraq, fallen into chaos and anarchy. Some of these attacks Zarqawi indeed claimed responsibility for, as well as for some attacks in Morocco, Turkey and Jordan, and some foiled attacks in Turkey and Jordan, all listed in the section 'Attacks' below.

Zarqawi targeted Shia Islamic mosques as well as civilians, U.N. representatives, Iraqi government institutions, Egypt's ambassador, Russian diplomats and foreign civilians in Iraq and hotel visitors in Jordan, possibly also Christian churches, the Jordanian embassy, and the U.S.-led Multi-National Force in Iraq, most of whom he professedly hated either as apostates of Islam, or as "infidels" "giving Palestine to the Jews", or as individuals oppressing and "humiliating our [Islamic] people" or "nation".  Al-Zarqawi was part of the leadership of Ansar al-Islam and was believed to have fled into Iran during the assault.

U.S. chasing Zarqawi, 2003–2006 
The Bush Administration in February 2003 in the U.N. Security Council used Zarqawi's alleged presence in Iraq as a part of the justification for the March 2003 invasion of Iraq.

On December 17, 2004, the U.S. State Department added Zarqawi and the Jama'at al-Tawhid wal-Jihad group to its "list of Foreign Terrorist Organizations" and ordered a freeze on any assets that the group might have in the United States.

By May 2005 Zarqawi was the most wanted man in Jordan and Iraq, had claimed scores of attacks in Iraq against Iraqis and foreigners, and was blamed for perhaps even more. The U.S. government then offered a $25m reward for information leading to his capture, the same amount offered for the capture of bin Laden before March 2004.

On February 24, 2006, the U.S. Department of Justice's FBI also added al-Zarqawi to the "Seeking Information – War on Terrorism" list, the first time that he had ever been added to any of the FBI's three major "wanted" lists.

For the U.S. eventually killing Zarqawi in 2006, see the section Death.

Wives and children 
 Zarqawi's first wife, Umm Mohammed, was a Jordanian woman who was around 40 years old when Zarqawi died in June 2006. She lived in Zarqa, Jordan, along with their four children, including a seven-year-old son, Musab. She had advised Zarqawi to leave Iraq temporarily and give orders to his deputies from outside the country. "He gave me an angry look and said, 'Me, me? I can't betray my religion and get out of Iraq. In the Name of Allah, I will not leave Iraq until victory or martyrdom'," she said of al-Zarqawi.
 Zarqawi's second wife, Isra, was 14 years old when he married her. She was the daughter of Yassin Jarrad, a Palestinian Islamic militant, who is blamed for the killing in 2003 of Ayatollah Muhammad Baqir al-Hakim, the Iraqi Shia leader. Her brother, Mohammad Jarad, was also a militant, who died in his 20s in 2013 while fighting for the Al-Nusra Front in Syria. She bore him a child when she was 15 and was killed along with Zarqawi and their child.
 Zarqawi's third wife was an Iraqi who might have perished in the airstrike with her husband.
 Zarqawi is also said to have married a woman from a Pakistani tribe around Peshawar.

Attacks

Attacks outside Iraq
In 1999, Zarqawi, according to Jordanian officials, became involved in a plot to blow up the Radisson SAS Hotel in Amman, where many Israeli and American tourists lodged, before New Year's Day 2000. He failed in this attempt and fled to Afghanistan and then entered Iraq via Iran after the overthrow of the Taliban in late 2001.

From Iraq, he started his terrorist campaign by hiring men to kill Laurence Foley who was a senior U.S. diplomat working for the U.S. Agency for International Development in Jordan. On October 28, 2002, Foley was assassinated outside his home in Amman. Under interrogation by Jordanian authorities, three suspects confessed that they had been armed and paid by Zarqawi to perform the assassination. U.S. officials believe that the planning and execution of the Foley assassination was led by members of Afghan Jihad, the International Mujaheddin Movement, and al-Qaeda. One of the leaders, Salim Sa'd Salim Bin-Suwayd, was paid over $27,858 for his work in planning assassinations in Jordan against U.S., Israeli, and Jordanian government officials. Suwayd was arrested in Jordan for the murder of Foley. Zarqawi was again sentenced in absentia in Jordan; this time, as before, his sentence was death.

Zarqawi, according to the BBC, was named as the brains behind a series of deadly bomb attacks in Casablanca, Morocco and Istanbul, Turkey in 2003. U.S. officials believe that Zarqawi trained others in the use of poison (ricin) for possible attacks in Europe. Zarqawi had also planned to attack a NATO summit in June 2004. According to suspects arrested in Turkey, Zarqawi sent them to Istanbul to organize an attack on a NATO summit there on June 28 or 29, 2004. On April 26, 2004, Jordanian authorities announced they had broken up an al-Qaeda plot to use chemical weapons in Amman. Among the targets were the U.S. Embassy, the Jordanian prime minister's office and the headquarters of Jordanian intelligence. In a series of raids, the Jordanians seized 20 tons of chemicals, including blistering agents, nerve gas and numerous explosives. Also seized were three trucks equipped with specially modified plows, apparently designed to crash through security barricades. Jordanian state television aired a videotape of four men admitting they were part of the plot. One of the conspirators, Azmi Al-Jayousi, said that he was acting on the orders of Abu-Musab al-Zarqawi and that he obtained training in chemical weapons. However, Al-Jayousi would later retract his confession stating that it was obtained via duress. Zarqawi would admit that an attack was planned, but would deny the use of chemical weapons referring to such claims as fabrications by the Jordanian government. Likewise, independent and U.S. investigators were skeptical of Jordanian claims of a chemical weapons attack. Furthermore, many experts and observers suspected that the Jordanian government exaggerated the details of the plot on purpose for political gain. On February 15, 2006, Jordan's High Court of Security sentenced nine men, including al-Zarqawi, to death for their involvement in the plot. Zarqawi was convicted of planning the entire attack from his post in Iraq, funding the operation with nearly $120,000, and sending a group of Jordanians into Jordan to execute the plan. Eight of the defendants were accused of belonging to a previously unknown group, "Kata'eb al-Tawhid" or Battalions of Monotheism, which was headed by al-Zarqawi and linked to al Qaeda.

The November 2005 Amman bombings that killed sixty people in three hotels, including several officials of the Palestinian Authority and members of a Chinese defense delegation, were claimed by Zarqawi's group 'Al-Qaeda in Iraq'.

Attacks inside Iraq
Stephen Hayes wrote for The Weekly Standard, that March 2003 British Intelligence "reporting since (February)" suggests that before the invasion of Iraq, Zarqawi ran a "terrorist haven" in  Kurdish northern Iraq, and that Zarqawi had set up "sleeper cells" in Baghdad, "to be activated during a U.S. occupation of the city... These cells apparently intend to attack U.S. targets using car bombs and other weapons. (It is also possible that they have received [chemical and biological] materials from terrorists in the Kurdish Autonomous Zone), ... al Qaeda-associated terrorists continued to arrive in Baghdad in early March." Later on, it was discovered that some reporting by Stephen Hayes had been incorrect—among them was Zarqawi's prosthetic limb. When Zarqawi was killed, it was evident he did not have a prosthetic limb. The anti-war movement accused Stephen Hayes of having invented stories, and Loretta Napoleani, author of several books on terrorism, including Terror Incorporated, argued that the importance of Zarqawi was built on incomplete Kurdish intelligence and then fomented by the U.S. to make him the new face of al-Qaeda.

In May 2004, a video appeared on an alleged al-Qaeda website showing a group of five men, their faces covered with keffiyeh or balaclavas, beheading American civilian Nicholas Berg, who had been abducted and taken hostage in Iraq weeks earlier. The CIA confirmed that the speaker on the tape wielding the knife that killed Berg was al-Zarqawi. The video opens with the title "Abu Musab al-Zarqawi slaughters an American". The speaker states that the murder was in retaliation for U.S. abuses at the Abu Ghraib prison (see Abu Ghraib prison abuse scandal). Following the death of al-Zarqawi, CNN spoke with Nicholas' father and long-time anti-war activist Michael Berg, who stated that al-Zarqawi's killing would lead to further vengeance and was not a cause for rejoicing. The CIA also confirmed that Zarqawi personally beheaded another American civilian, Olin Eugene Armstrong, in September 2004.

United States officials implicated Zarqawi in over 700 killings in Iraq during the invasion, mostly from bombings. Since March 2004, that number rose into the thousands. According to the United States State Department, Zarqawi was responsible for the Canal Hotel bombing of the United Nations Headquarters in Iraq on August 19, 2003. This attack killed twenty-two people, including the United Nations secretary general's special Iraqi envoy Sergio Vieira de Mello. Zarqawi's biggest alleged atrocities in Iraq included the attacks on the Shia shrines in Karbala and Baghdad in March 2004, which killed over 180 people, and the car bomb attacks in Najaf and Karbala in December 2004, which claimed over 60 lives.
Zarqawi is believed by the former Coalition Provisional Authority in Iraq to have written an intercepted letter to the al-Qaeda leadership in February 2004 on the progress of the "Iraqi jihad". However, al-Qaeda denied they had written the letter. The U.S. military believes Zarqawi organized the February 2006 attack on the Al Askari Mosque in Samarra, in an attempt to trigger sectarian violence between Sunnis and Shi'ites in Iraq.

In a January 2005 internet recording, Zarqawi condemned democracy as "the big American lie" and said participants in Iraq's January 30 election were enemies of Islam. Zarqawi stated "We have declared a bitter war against democracy and all those who seek to enact it... Democracy is also based on the right to choose your religion [and that is] against the rule of Allah."

On April 25, 2006, a video appearing to show Zarqawi surfaced. In the tape, the man says holy warriors are fighting on despite a three-year "crusade". U.S. experts told the BBC they believed the recording was genuine. One part of the recording shows a man—who bears a strong resemblance to previous pictures of Zarqawi—sitting on the floor and addressing a group of masked men with an automatic rifle at his side. "Your mujahideen sons were able to confront the most ferocious of crusader campaigns on a Muslim state," the man says. Addressing U.S. President George W. Bush, he says: "Why don't you tell people that your soldiers are committing suicide, taking drugs and hallucination pills to help them sleep?" "By Allah", he says, "your dreams will be defeated by our blood and by our bodies. What is coming is even worse." The speaker in the video also reproaches the U.S. for its "arrogance and insolence" in rejecting a truce offered by "our prince and leader", Osama Bin Laden. The United States Army aired an unedited tape of Zarqawi in May 2006 highlighting the fact that he did not know how to clear a stoppage on the stolen M249 Squad Automatic Weapon he was using.

Attempts to provoke U.S. attack on Iran
A document found in Zarqawi's safe house indicates that the group was trying to provoke the U.S. to attack Iran in order to reinvigorate the insurgency in Iraq and to weaken American forces in Iraq. "The question remains, how to draw the Americans into fighting a war against Iran? It is not known whether America is serious in its animosity towards Iran, because of the big support Iran is offering to America in its war in Afghanistan and in Iraq. Hence, it is necessary first to exaggerate the Iranian danger and to convince America, and the West in general, of the real danger coming from Iran..." The document then outlines six ways to incite war between the two nations. Some experts questioned the authenticity of the document.

Links to al-Qaeda
After the 2001 war in Afghanistan, Zarqawi appeared on a U.S. list of most-wanted al-Qaeda terrorists still at large in early 2002.

According to The Washington Post and some other sources, he formally swore loyalty (Bay'ah) to bin Laden in October 2004 and was in turn appointed bin Laden's deputy. Zarqawi then changed the name of his Monotheism and Jihad network to Tanẓīm Qāʻidat al-Jihād fī Bilād al-Rāfidayn, which became commonly known as Al-Qaeda in Iraq (AQI).

Pre-U.S. invasion of Iraq
Before the invasion of Afghanistan, Zarqawi was the leader of an Islamic militant group with some connections to al-Qaeda. In an interview on Al-Majd TV, former al-Qaeda member Walid Khan, who was in Afghanistan fighting alongside Zarqawi's group explained that from the day al-Zarqawi's group arrived, there were disagreements, differences of opinion with bin Laden. Saif al-Adel, later bin Laden's military chief and an Egyptian who attempted to overthrow the Egyptian government, saw merit in Zarqawi's overall objective of overthrowing the Jordanian monarchy. He intervened and smoothed the relations between Zarqawi and Al Qaeda leadership. It was agreed that Zarqawi would be given the funds to start up his training camp outside the Afghan city of Herat, near the Iranian border.

Zarqawi's group continued to receive funding from Osama bin Laden and pursued "a largely distinct, if occasionally overlapping agenda", according to The Washington Post. Counterterrorism experts told The Washington Post that while Zarqawi accepted al-Qaeda's financial help to set up a training camp in Afghanistan he ran it independently and while bin Laden was planning September 11, Zarqawi was busy developing a plot to topple the Jordanian monarchy and attack Israel.

The Washington Post also reported that German Intelligence wiretaps found that in the fall of 2001 Zarqawi grew angry when his members were raising money in Germany for al-Qaeda's local leadership. "If something should come from their side, simply do not accept it," Zarqawi told one of his followers, according to a recorded conversation that was played at a trial of four alleged Zarqawi operatives in Düsseldorf.

In 2001, bin Laden repeatedly summoned al-Zarqawi from Herat to Kandahar, asking that he take an oath of allegiance to him. Al-Zarqawi refused; he didn't want to take sides against the Northern Alliance and doubted the fervor of bin Laden and the Taliban. When the United States launched its air war inside Afghanistan, on October 7, 2001, al-Zarqawi joined forces with al-Qaeda and the Taliban for the first time. He and his Jund al-Sham fought in and around Herat and Kandahar. When Zarqawi finally did take the oath in October 2004, it was after eight months of negotiations.

When Shadi Abdellah was arrested in 2002, he cooperated with authorities, but suggested that al-Zarqawi and Osama bin Laden were not as closely linked as previously believed, in large part because al-Zarqawi disagreed with many of the sentiments put forward by Mahfouz Ould al-Walid for al-Qaeda.

In April 2007, former Director of Central Intelligence George Tenet released his memoir titled At the Center of the Storm: My Years at the CIA. In the book he reveals that in July 2001, an associate of Zarqawi had been detained and, during interrogations, linked Zarqawi with al-Qaeda operative Abu Zubaydah. Tenet also wrote in his book that Thirwat Shehata and Yussef Dardiri, "assessed by a senior al-Qa'ida detainee to be among the Egyptian Islamic Jihad's best operational planners", arrived in Baghdad in May 2002 and were engaged in "sending recruits to train in Zarqawi's camps".

Post-U.S. invasion of Iraq
During or shortly before the invasion of Iraq in March 2003, Zarqawi returned to Iraq, where he met with Bin Laden's military chief, Saif al-Adel (Muhammad Ibrahim Makawi), who asked him to coordinate the entry of al-Qaeda operatives into Iraq through Syria. Zarqawi readily agreed and by the fall of 2003 a steady flow of Arab Islamists were infiltrating Iraq via Syria. Although many of these foreign fighters were not members of Tawhid, they became more or less dependent on Zarqawi's local contacts once they entered the unfamiliar country. Moreover, given Tawhid's superior intelligence gathering capability, it made little sense for non-Tawhid operatives to plan and carry out attacks without coordinating with Zarqawi's lieutenants. Consequentially, Zarqawi came to be recognized as the regional "emir" of Islamist terrorists in Iraq without having sworn fealty to bin Laden.

U.S. intelligence intercepted a January 2004 letter from Zarqawi to al Qaeda and American officials made it public in February 2004. In the letter to bin Laden, Zarqawi wrote:

In October 2004, a message on an Islamic Web site posted in the name of the spokesman of Zarqawi's group announced that Zarqawi had sworn his network's allegiance to Osama bin Laden and al Qaeda. The message stated:

On December 27, 2004, Al Jazeera broadcast an audiotape of bin Laden calling Zarqawi "the prince of al Qaeda in Iraq" and asked "all our organization brethren to listen to him and obey him in his good deeds." Since that time, Zarqawi had referred to his own organization as Tanzim Qaidat al-Jihad fi Bilad al-Rafidayn.

In May 2007, President George W. Bush declassified a U.S. intelligence report that stated that bin Laden had enlisted Zarqawi to plan strikes inside the U.S., and warned that in January 2005 bin Laden had assigned Zarqawi to organize a cell inside Iraq that would be used to plan and carry out attacks against the U.S. "Bin Laden tasked the terrorist Zarqawi ... with forming a cell to conduct terrorist attacks outside of Iraq," Bush stated in a commencement address at the Coast Guard Academy. "Bin Laden emphasized that America should be Zarqawi's No. 1 priority."

Terrorism experts' view on the alliance
According to experts, Zarqawi gave al-Qaeda a highly visible presence in Iraq at a time when its original leaders went into hiding or were killed after the September 11, 2001 terrorist attacks in the United States. In turn, al-Qaeda leaders were able to brand a new franchise in Iraq and claim they were at the forefront of the fight to expel U.S. forces. But this relationship was proven to be fragile as Zarqawi angered al-Qaeda leaders by focusing attacks on Iraqi Shias more often than the U.S. military. In September 2005, U.S. intelligence officials said they had confiscated a long letter that al-Qaeda's deputy leader, Ayman al-Zawahiri, had written to Zarqawi, bluntly warning that Muslim public opinion was turning against him. According to Paul Wilkinson, chairman of the Center for the Study of Terrorism and Political Violence at the University of St. Andrews in Scotland, "A number of al-Qaeda figures were uncomfortable with the tactics he was using in Iraq ... It was quite clear with Zarqawi that as far as the al-Qaeda core leadership goes, they couldn't control the way in which their network affiliates operated."

U.S. officials' view of the alliance
In June 2004, Secretary of Defense Donald Rumsfeld conceded that Zarqawi's ties to Al Qaeda may have been much more ambiguous—and that he may have been more of a rival than a lieutenant to bin Laden. Zarqawi "may very well not have sworn allegiance to [bin Laden]", Rumsfeld said at a Pentagon briefing. "Maybe he disagrees with him on something, maybe because he wants to be 'The Man' himself and maybe for a reason that's not known to me." Rumsfeld added, "someone could legitimately say he's not Al Qaeda."

According to the Senate Report on Prewar Intelligence released in September 2006, "in April 2003 the CIA learned from a senior al-Qa'ida detainee that al-Zarqawi had rebuffed several efforts by bin Ladin to recruit him. The detainee claimed that al-Zarqawi had religious differences with bin Ladin and disagreed with bin Laden's singular focus against the United States. The CIA assessed in April 2003 that al-Zarqawi planned and directed independent terrorist operations without al Qaeda direction, but assessed that he 'most likely contracts out his network's services to al Qaeda in return for material and financial assistance from key al Qaeda facilitators.'"

In the April 2006 National Intelligence Estimate, declassified in September 2006, it asserts, "Al-Qa'ida, now merged with Abu Mus'ab al-Zarqawi's network, is exploiting the situation in Iraq to attract new recruits and donors and to maintain its leadership role."

Links to Saddam Hussein

On February 5, 2003, then Secretary of State Colin Powell addressed the U.N. Security Council on the issue of Iraq. Regarding Zarqawi, Powell stated that:

Zarqawi recuperated in Baghdad after being wounded while fighting along with Taliban and al-Qaeda fighters in Afghanistan. According to the 2004 Senate Report of Pre-war Intelligence on Iraq, "A foreign government service asserted that the IIS (Iraqi Intelligence Service) knew where al-Zarqawi was located despite Baghdad's claims that it could not find him." The Senate Report on Prewar Intelligence also stated "As indicated in Iraqi Support for Terrorism, the Iraqi regime was, at a minimum, aware of al-Zarqawi's presence in Baghdad in 2002 because a foreign government service passed information regarding his whereabouts to Iraqi authorities in June 2002. Despite Iraq's pervasive security apparatus and its receipt of detailed information about al-Zarqawi's possible location, however, Iraqi Intelligence told the foreign government service it could not locate al-Zarqawi."

Jordanian analysis
A Jordanian security official told The Washington Post that documents recovered after the overthrow of Saddam show that Iraqi agents detained some of Zarqawi's operatives but released them after questioning. He also told The Washington Post that the Iraqis warned the Zarqawi operatives that the Jordanians knew where they were. The official also told The Washington Post, "'We sent many memos to Iraq during this time, asking them to identify his position, where he was, how he got weapons, how he smuggled them across the border,' but Hussein's government never responded."

This claim was reiterated by Jordanian King Abdullah II in an interview with Al-Hayat. Abdullah revealed that Saddam Hussein had rejected repeated requests from Jordan to hand over al-Zarqawi. According to Abdullah, "We had information that he entered Iraq from a neighboring country, where he lived and what he was doing. We informed the Iraqi authorities about all this detailed information we had, but they didn't respond." Abdullah told the Al-Hayat that Jordan exerted "big efforts" with Saddam's government to extradite al-Zarqawi, but added, "our demands that the former regime hand him over were in vain."

One high-level Jordanian intelligence official told The Atlantic that al-Zarqawi, after leaving Afghanistan in December 2001, frequently traveled to the Sunni Triangle of Iraq where he expanded his network, recruited and trained new fighters, and set up bases, safe houses, and military training camps. He said, however, "We know Zarqawi better than he knows himself. And I can assure you that he never had any links to Saddam."

Counterterrorism scholar Loretta Napoleoni quotes former Jordanian parliamentarian Layth Shubaylat, a radical Islamist opposition figure, who was personally acquainted with both Zarqawi and Saddam Hussein:

U.S. conclusion
A CIA report in late 2004 concluded that there was no evidence Saddam's government was involved or even aware of this medical treatment, and found no conclusive evidence the regime had harbored Zarqawi. A U.S. official told Reuters that the report was a mix of new information and a look at some older information and did not make any final judgments or come to any definitive conclusions. "To suggest the case is closed on this would not be correct," the official said. A U.S. official familiar with the report told Knight-Ridder, "what is indisputable is that Zarqawi was operating out of Baghdad and was involved in a lot of bad activities." Another U.S. official summarized the report as such: "The evidence is that Saddam never gave Zarqawi anything."

According to the 2004 Senate Report on Prewar Intelligence, "The CIA provided four reports detailing the debriefings of Abu Zubaydah, a captured senior coordinator for al-Qaida responsible for training and recruiting. Abu Zubaydah said that he was not aware of a relationship between Iraq and al-Qaida. He also said, however, that any relationship would be highly compartmented and went on to name al-Qaida members who he thought had good contacts with the Iraqis. For instance, Abu Zubaydah indicated that he had heard that an important al-Qaida associate, Abu Mus'ab al-Zarqawi, and others had good relationships with Iraqi Intelligence."

A classified memo obtained by Stephen F. Hayes, prepared by Undersecretary of Defense for Policy Douglas J. Feith in response to questions posed by the Senate Intelligence Committee as part of its investigation into prewar intelligence, stated the following regarding al-Zarqawi:

The memo was a collection of raw intelligence reports and drew no conclusions. U.S. intelligence officials conveyed to Newsweek that the "reports [in the memo] were old, uncorroborated and came from sources of unknown if not dubious credibility".

The 2006 Senate Report on Prewar Intelligence concluded that Zarqawi was not a link between Saddam and al-Qaeda: "Postwar information indicates that Saddam Hussein attempted, unsuccessfully, to locate and capture al-Zarqawi and that the regime did not have a relationship with, harbor, or turn a blind eye toward Zarqawi." The report also cited the debriefing of a "high-ranking Iraqi official" by the FBI. The official stated that a foreign government requested in October 2002 that the IIS locate five individuals suspected of involvement in the murder of Laurence Foley, which led to the arrest of Abu Yasim Sayyem in early 2003. The official told the FBI that evidence of Sayyem's ties to Zarqawi was compelling, and thus, he was "shocked" when Sayemm was ordered released by Saddam. The official stated it "was ludicrous to think that the IIS had any involvement with al-Qaeda or Zarqawi," and suggested Saddam let Sayyem go because he "would participate in striking U.S. forces when they entered Iraq." In 2005, according to the Senate report, the CIA amended its 2004 report to conclude, "the regime did not have a relationship, harbor, or turn a blind eye toward Zarqawi and his associates." (pp. 91–92) An intelligence official familiar with the CIA assessment also told Michael Isikoff of Newsweek magazine that the current draft of the report says that while Zarqawi did likely receive medical treatment in Baghdad in 2002, the report concludes, "most evidence suggests Saddam Hussein did not provide Zarqawi safe haven before the war, ... [but] it also recognizes that there are still unanswered questions and gaps in knowledge about the relationship."

The Army's Foreign Military Studies Office website translated a letter dated August 17, 2002, from an Iraqi intelligence official. The letter is part of the Operation Iraqi Freedom documents. The letter asks agents in the country to be on the lookout for Abu Musab al-Zarqawi and another unnamed man. Pictures of both men were attached.

The letter issued the following 3 directives:
 Instructing your sources to continue their surveillance of the above-mentioned individuals in your area of operations and inform us once you initiate such action.
 Coordinate with Directorate 18 to verify the photographs of the above-mentioned with photos of the members of the Jordanian community within your area of operations.
 Conduct a comprehensive survey of all tourist facilities (hotels, furnished apartments, and leased homes). Give this matter your utmost attention. Keep us informed.

The documents also contain responses to this request. One response, dated August 2002, states "Upon verifying the information through our sources and friends in the field as well as office (3), we found no information to confirm the presence of the above-mentioned in our area of operation. Please review, we suggest circulating the contents of this message." Another response, also dated August 2002, states "After closely examining the data and through our sources and friends in (SATTS: U R A) square, and in Al-Qa'im immigration office, and in Office (3), none of the mentioned individuals are documented to be present in our area of jurisdiction."

According to ABC News, "The letter seems to be coming from or going to Trebil, a town on the Iraqi-Jordanian border. Follow up on the presence of those subjects is ordered, as well as a comparison of their pictures with those of Jordanian subjects living in Iraq. (This may be referring to pictures of Abu Musaab al Zarqawi and another man on pp. 4–6.)"

In his book At the Center of the Storm, George Tenet writes:

According to Tenet, while Zarqawi did find a safe haven in Iraq and did supervise camps in northeastern Iraq run by the Kurdish group Ansar al-Islam, "the intelligence did not show any Iraqi authority, direction, or control over any of the many specific terrorist acts carried out by al-Qa'ida."

Debates over level of influence
How much influence al-Zarqawi had in Iraq and after his death is disputed.

Importance
Writing in 2015, nine years after his death, an anonymous author in the New York Review of Books describes al-Zarqawi as having been responsible for "turning an insurgency against US troops" in Iraq "into a Shia–Sunni civil war". The Washington Post reporter Joby Warrick argues that al-Zarqawi was the founder of "the group that became ISIS". Among other things, Warrick believes al-Zarqawi expanded the already broad "parameters of violence" in Iraq and the Middle East.

He personally beheaded civilians on video; directed suicide bombs at targets that other jihadis considered off limits like the UN, NGOs, and Arab embassies; and struck Shia religious targets with the ultimately successfully goal of provoking a destabilizing Sunni–Shia civil war. Even Al Qaeda thought he was going too far ... but Zarqawi's methods proved to have enduring traction long after his death in 2006.

While the US "troop surge" and "Awakening" movement left his movement "all but dead" in 2009, it survived and metastasized into ISIS according to author David Ignatius.

Doubts about his importance
Some months before and after his killing, several sources claimed that Zarqawi was variously an American "Boogeyman" and product of its war propaganda, the product of faulty U.S. intelligence, a U.S. or Israeli agent, did not really exist, was unlikely to be an important insurgent leader because he had no real leadership capabilities, and/or did not behead Nicholas Berg.

According to the Commonwealth Institute his notoriety was the product of U.S. war propaganda designed to promote the image of a demonic enemy figure to help justify continued U.S. military operations in Iraq, perhaps with the tacit support of jihadi elements who wished to use him as a propaganda tool or as a distraction. In one report, conservative newspaper The Daily Telegraph described the claim that Zarqawi was the head of the "terrorist network" in Iraq as a "myth". This report cited an unnamed U.S. military intelligence source to the effect that the Zarqawi leadership "myth" was initially caused by faulty intelligence, but was later accepted because it suited U.S. government political goals. One Sunni insurgent leader claimed, "Zarqawi is an American, Israeli and Iranian agent who is trying to keep our country unstable so that the Sunnis will keep facing occupation."

On February 18, 2006, Shiite cleric Muqtada al-Sadr made similar charges:

On April 10, 2006, The Washington Post reported that the U.S. military conducted a major propaganda offensive designed to exaggerate Zarqawi's role in the Iraqi insurgency. Gen. Mark Kimmitt says of the propaganda campaign that there "was no attempt to manipulate the press". In an internal briefing, Kimmitt is quoted as stating, "The Zarqawi PSYOP Program is the most successful information campaign to date." The main goal of the propaganda campaign seems to have been to exacerbate a rift between insurgent forces in Iraq, but intelligence experts worried that it had actually enhanced Zarqawi's influence. Col. Derek Harvey, who served as a military intelligence officer in Iraq and then was one of the top officers handling Iraq intelligence issues on the staff of the Joint Chiefs of Staff, warned an Army meeting in 2004, "Our own focus on Zarqawi has enlarged his caricature, if you will – made him more important than he really is, in some ways." While Pentagon spokespersons state unequivocally that PSYOPs may not be used to influence American citizens, there is little question that the information disseminated through the program has found its way into American media sources. The Washington Post also notes, "One briefing slide about U.S. 'strategic communications' in Iraq, prepared for Army Gen. George W. Casey Jr., the top U.S. commander in Iraq, describes the 'home audience' as one of six major targets of the American side of the war."

On July 4, 2006, the U.S. ambassador to Baghdad Zalmay Khalilzad, in an interview with the BBC, said: "In terms of the level of violence, it (the death of al-Zarqawi) has not had any impact at this point... the level of violence is still quite high." But Khalilzad maintained his view that the killing had though encouraged some insurgent groups to "reach out" and join government reconciliation talks; he believed that previously these groups were intimidated by Zarqawi's presence.

On June 8, 2006, on the BBC's Question Time program, the Respect Party MP George Galloway referred to al-Zarqawi as "a 'Boogeyman', built up by the Americans to try and perpetrate the lie that the resistance in Iraq are by foreigners, and that the mass of the Iraqis are with the American and British occupation". Jeffrey Gettleman of The New York Times supported this saying "several people who knew Mr. Zarqawi well, including former cellmates, voiced doubts about his ability to be an insurgent leader, or the leader of anything." In the July/August 2006 issue of The Atlantic, Mary Anne Weaver doubted that the figure who beheaded Nicholas Berg in the execution video was in fact al-Zarqawi.

In a story detailing her captivity in Iraq, Jill Carroll, a journalist for The Christian Science Monitor, casts doubt on al-Zarqawi's alleged unimportance. She describes how one of her captors, who identified himself as Abdullah Rashid and leader of the Mujahideen Shura Council in Iraq, conveyed to her that:

The Americans were constantly saying that the mujahideen in Iraq were led by foreigners... So, the Iraqi insurgents went to Zarqawi and insisted that an Iraqi be put in charge. But as I saw in coming weeks, Zarqawi remained the insurgents' hero, and the most influential member of their council, whatever Nour/Rashid's position. And it seemed to me, based on snatches of conversations, that two cell leaders under him – Abu Rasha and Abu Ahmed [al-Kuwaiti] – might also be on the council. At various times, I heard my captors discussing changes in their plans because of directives from the council and Zarqawi.

Pre-war assassination opportunities
According to NBC News, the Pentagon had pushed to "take out" Zarqawi's operation at least three times prior to the 2003 invasion of Iraq, but had been vetoed by the National Security Council. The NSC reportedly made its decision in an effort to convince other countries to join the U.S. in a coalition against Iraq. "People were more obsessed with developing the coalition to overthrow Saddam than to execute the president's policy of pre-emption against terrorists," said former National Security Council member Roger Cressey.

In May 2005, former CIA official Michael Scheuer, who headed the CIA's bin Laden unit for six years before resigning in 2004, corroborated this. Paraphrasing his remarks, the Australian Broadcasting Corporation stated Scheuer claimed, "the United States deliberately turned down several opportunities to kill terrorist Abu Musab al-Zarqawi in the lead-up to the Iraq war." ABC added, "a plan to destroy Zarqawi's training camp in Kurdistan was abandoned for diplomatic reasons." Scheuer explained, "the reasons the intelligence service got for not shooting Zarqawi was simply that the President and the National Security Council decided it was more important not to give the Europeans the impression we were gunslingers" in an effort to win support for ousting Saddam Hussein.

This claim was also corroborated by CENTCOM's Deputy Commander, Lieutenant General Michael DeLong, in an interview with PBS on February 14, 2006. DeLong, however, claims that the reasons for abandoning the opportunity to take out Zarqawi's camp was that the Pentagon feared that an attack would contaminate the area with chemical weapon materials:

We almost took them out three months before the Iraq war started. We almost took that thing, but we were so concerned that the chemical cloud from there could devastate the region that we chose to take them by land rather than by smart weapons.

In his 2010 memoir Decision Points, President Bush recounted:

The question was whether to bomb the poisons lab in the summer of 2002. We held a series of NSC meetings on that topic... Colin [Powell] and Condi [Condoleezza Rice] felt a strike on the lab would create an international firestorm and disrupt our efforts to build a coalition to confront Saddam... I decided to continue on the diplomatic track.

Reports of death, detention and injuries

Missing leg
Claims of harm to Zarqawi changed over time. Early in 2002, there were unverified reports from Afghan Northern Alliance members that Zarqawi had been killed by a missile attack in Afghanistan. Many news sources repeated the claim. Later, Kurdish groups claimed that Zarqawi had not died in the missile strike, but had been severely injured, and went to Baghdad in 2002 to have his leg amputated. On October 7, 2002, the day before Congress voted to give President George W. Bush authorization to invade Iraq, Bush gave a speech in Cincinnati, Ohio, that repeated as fact the claim that he had sought medical treatment in Baghdad. This was one of several of President Bush's examples of ways Saddam Hussein had aided, funded, and harbored al-Qaeda. Powell repeated this claim in his February 2003 speech to the UN, urging a resolution for war, and it soon became "common knowledge" that Zarqawi had a prosthetic leg.

In 2004, Newsweek reported that some "senior U.S. military officials in Baghdad" had come to believe that he still had his original legs. Knight Ridder later reported that the leg amputation was something "officials now acknowledge was incorrect".

When the video of the Berg beheading was released in 2004, credence was given to the claim that Zarqawi was alive and active. The man identified as Zarqawi in the video did not appear to have a prosthetic leg. Videos of Zarqawi aired in 2006 that clearly showed him with both legs intact. When Zarqawi's body was autopsied, X-rays revealed that his right lower leg was fractured.

Claims of death

In March 2004, an insurgent group in Iraq issued a statement saying that Zarqawi had been killed in April 2003. The statement said that he was unable to escape the missile attack because of his prosthetic leg. His followers claimed he was killed in a U.S. bombing raid in the north of Iraq. The claim that Zarqawi had been killed in northern Iraq "at the beginning of the war", and that subsequent use of his name was a useful myth, was repeated in September 2005 by Sheikh Jawad Al-Khalessi, a Shiite imam.

On May 24, 2005, it was reported on an Islamic website that a deputy would take command of Al-Qaeda while Zarqawi recovered from injuries sustained in an attack. Later that week the Iraqi government confirmed that Zarqawi had been wounded by U.S. forces, although the battalion did not realize it at the time. The extent of his injuries is not known, although some radical Islamic websites called for prayers for his health. There are reports that a local hospital treated a man, suspected to be Zarqawi, with severe injuries. He was also said to have subsequently left Iraq for a neighbouring country, accompanied by two physicians. However, later that week the radical Islamic website retracted its report about his injuries and claimed that he was in fine health and was running the jihad operation.

In a September 16, 2005, article published by Le Monde, Sheikh Jawad Al-Kalesi claimed that al-Zarqawi was killed in the Kurdish northern region of Iraq at the beginning of the U.S.-led war on the country as he was meeting with members of the Kurdish Ansar al-Islam group affiliated to al-Qaeda. Al-Kalesi also claimed "His family in Jordan even held a ceremony after his death." He also claimed, "Zarqawi has been used as a ploy by the United States, as an excuse to continue the occupation" and saying, "It was a pretext so they don't leave Iraq."

On November 20, 2005, some news sources reported that Zarqawi may have been killed in a coalition assault on a house in Mosul; five of those in the house were killed in the assault while the other three died through using 'suicide belts' of explosives. United States and British soldiers searched the remains, with U.S. forces using DNA samples to identify the dead. However, none of those remains belonged to him.

On June 8, 2006, NBC news and the Pentagon reported that the US Special Operations Group Delta Force had been responsible for killing Zarqawi.

Pentagon officials have refused to say whether U.S. special operations forces participated in the al-Zarqawi operation Wednesday, but a comment Friday by President Bush suggested that some of the military’s most secretive units may have been involved on the ground. Speaking to reporters, Bush mentioned that among the senior officers he called to offer congratulations for killing Zarqawi was Army Lt. Gen. Stanley McChrystal, commander of Joint Special Operations Command, whose forces include the Army’s clandestine counterterrorism unit, Delta Force.

Reportedly captured and released
According to a CNN report dated December 15, 2005, al-Zarqawi was captured by Iraqi forces sometime during 2004 and later released because his captors did not realize who he was. This claim was made by a Saudi suicide bomber, Ahmed Abdullah al-Shaiyah, who survived a failed suicide attack to blow up the Jordanian mission in Baghdad in December. "Do you know what has happened to Zarqawi and where he is?" an Iraqi investigator asked Mr. Shaiyah. He answered, "I don't know, but I heard from some of my mujahadeen brothers that Iraqi police had captured Zarqawi in Fallujah." Mr. Shaiyah says he then heard that the police let the terrorist go because they had failed to recognize him. U.S. officials called the report "plausible" but refused to confirm it.

Death

Five others were also reported killed.

The joint task force (Task Force 145) had been tracking him for some time, and although there were some close calls, he had eluded them on many occasions. United States intelligence officials then received tips from Iraqi senior leaders from Zarqawi's network that he and some of his associates were in the Baqubah area. According to the book Task Force Black by Mark Urban, the intelligence was received from a senior AQI leader who the author Mark Bowden dubbed "Abu Haydr" who had been captured in Operation Larchwood 4. The safehouse itself was watched for over six weeks before Zarqawi was observed entering the building by operators from Task Force 145. Jordanian intelligence reportedly helped to identify his location. The area was subsequently secured by Iraqi security forces, who were the first ground forces to arrive.

On June 8, 2006, coalition forces confirmed that Zarqawi's body was identified by facial recognition, fingerprinting, known scars and tattoos. They also announced the death of one of his key lieutenants, spiritual adviser Sheik Abd-Al-Rahman.

Initially, the U.S. military reported that Zarqawi was killed directly in the attack. However, according to a statement made the following day by Major General William Caldwell of the U.S. Army, Zarqawi survived for a short time after the bombing and, after being placed on a stretcher, attempted to move and was restrained, after which he died from his injuries. An Iraqi man, who claims to have arrived on the scene a few moments after the attack, said he saw U.S. troops beating up the badly wounded but still alive Zarqawi. In contradiction, Caldwell asserted that when U.S. troops found Zarqawi barely alive they tried to provide him with medical help, rejecting the allegations that he was beaten based on an autopsy performed. The account of the Iraqi witness has not been verified. All others in the house died immediately in the blasts. On June 12, 2006, it was reported that an autopsy performed by the U.S. military revealed that the cause of death to Zarqawi was a blast injury to the lungs but he took nearly an hour to die.

The U.S. government distributed an image of Zarqawi's corpse as part of the press pack associated with the press conference. The release of the image has been criticised for being in questionable taste and for inadvertently creating an iconic image of Zarqawi that would be used to rally his supporters.

Reactions to death
Prime Minister of Iraq Nouri al-Maliki commented on the death of Zarqawi by saying: "Today, Zarqawi has been terminated. Every time a Zarqawi appears we will kill him. We will continue confronting whoever follows his path."

United States President George W. Bush stated that through his every action Zarqawi sought to defeat America and its coalition partners by turning Iraq into a safe haven for al-Qaeda. Bush also stated, "Now Zarqawi has met his end and this violent man will never murder again."

Zarqawi's brother-in-law has since claimed that he was a martyr even though the family renounced Zarqawi and his actions in the aftermath of the Amman triple suicide bombing that killed at least 60 people. The opinion of Iraqis on his death was mixed; some believed that it would promote peace between the warring factions, while others were convinced that his death would provoke his followers to a massive retaliation and cause more bombings and deaths in Iraq.

A statement attributed to Abu Abdul Rahman "al-Iraqi", the deputy of al-Zarqawi, was released to Islamist websites, indicating that al-Qaeda in Iraq also confirmed Zarqawi's death, however Abu Abdul Rahman was killed during the same operation that killed al-Zarqawi. The online statement stated "We herald the martyrdom of our mujahed Sheikh Abu Musab al-Zarqawi in Iraq ... and we stress that this is an honor to our nation."

On June 16, 2006, Abu Abdullah Rashid al-Baghdadi, the head of the Mujahideen Shura Council, which groups five Iraqi insurgent organizations including Al-Qaeda in Iraq, released an audiotape statement in which he described the death of al-Zarqawi as a "great loss". He continued by stating that al-Zarqawi "will remain a symbol for all the mujahideen, who will take strength from his steadfastness". Al-Baghdadi is believed to be a former officer in Saddam's army, or its elite Republican Guard, who has worked closely with al-Zarqawi since the overthrow of Saddam's regime in April 2003.

Abdelmalek Droukdel, the leader of the Salafist Group for Preaching and Combat (GSPC), published a statement on a website where he said: "O infidels and apostates, your joy will be brief and you will cry for a long time... we are all Zarqawi." Al-Zarqawi had been Droukdel's mentor.

Counterterrorism officials have said that al-Zarqawi had become a key part of al-Qaeda's marketing campaign and that al-Zarqawi served as a "worldwide jihadist rallying point and a fundraising icon". Rep. Mike Rogers, R-Mich., who serves on the House Intelligence Committee, called al-Zarqawi "The terrorist celeb, if you will, ... It is like selling for any organization. They are selling the success of Zarqawi in eluding capture in Iraq."

On June 23, 2006, Al Jazeera aired a video in which Ayman al-Zawahiri, Al-Qaeda's No. 2 leader, states that Zarqawi was "a soldier, a hero, an imam and the prince of martyrs, [and his death] has defined the struggle between the crusaders and Islam in Iraq".

On June 30, 2006, Osama bin Laden released an audio recording in which he stated, "Our Islamic nation was surprised to find its knight, the lion of jihad, the man of determination and will, Abu Musab al-Zarqawi, killed in a shameful American raid. We pray to Allah to bless him and accept him among the martyrs as he had hoped for." Bin Laden also defended al-Zarqawi, saying he had "clear instructions" to focus on U.S.-led forces in Iraq but also "for those who ... stood to fight on the side of the crusaders against the Muslims, then he should kill them whoever they are, regardless of their sect or tribe." Shortly after, he released another audio tape in which he stated, "Our brothers, the mujahedeen in the al-Qaeda organization, have chosen the dear brother Abu Hamza al-Muhajer as their leader to succeed the Amir Abu Musab al-Zarqawi. I advise him to focus his fighting on the Americans and everyone who supports them and allies himself with them in their war on the people of Islam and Iraq."

Alleged betrayal by al-Qaeda
A day before Zarqawi was killed, a U.S. strategic analysis site suggested that Zarqawi could have lost the trust of Al-Qaeda due to his emphatic anti-Shia stance and the massacres of civilians allegedly committed in his name. Reports in The New York Times on June 8 treated the betrayal by at least one fellow Al-Qaeda member as fact, stating that an individual close to Zarqawi disclosed the identity and location of Sheikh Abu Abdul Rahman to Jordanian and American intelligence. Non-stop surveillance of Abu Abdul Rahman quickly led to Zarqawi. The Associated Press quotes an unnamed Jordanian official as saying that the effort to find Zarqawi was successful partly due to information that Jordan obtained one month beforehand from a captured Zarqawi Al-Qaeda operative named Ziad Khalaf Raja al-Karbouly.

Reward
In apparent contradiction to statements made earlier in the day by U.S. ambassador to Iraq Zalmay Khalilzad, an Iraqi spokesman said the US$25 million reward "will be honored". Khalilzad, in an interview with CNN's Wolf Blitzer, had stated the bounty would not be paid because the decisive information leading to Zarqawi's whereabouts had been supplied by an al-Qaeda in Iraq operative whose own complicity in violent acts would disqualify him from receiving payment.

Rep. Mark Kirk, a Republican of Illinois who drafted the legislation specifying the Zarqawi reward, was quoted as saying contemporaneously that the Bush Administration planned to pay "some rewards" for Zarqawi. "I don't have the specifics," he stated. "The administration is now working out who will get it and how much. As their appropriator who funds them, I asked them to let me know if they need more money to run the rewards program now that they are paying this out."

Post-Zarqawi Iraq environment
Zarqawi's death was seen as a major coup for the U.S. government in terms of the political and propaganda stakes. However, unconfirmed rumors in early April 2006 suggested that Zarqawi had been demoted from a strategic or coordinating function to overseer of paramilitary/terrorist activities of his group and that Abdullah bin Rashed al-Baghdadi of the Mujahideen Shura Council succeeded Zarqawi in the former function. On June 15, 2006, the United States military officially identified Abu Ayyub al-Masri as the successor to Al-Qaeda in Iraq.

After Zarqawi's demise in early June 2006 there was little or no immediately identifiable change in terms of the level of violence and attacks against U.S. and allied troops. In the immediate aftermath insurgency attacks averaged 90 a day, apparently some of the highest on record. Four months after Zarqawi's death, it was estimated that 374 coalition soldiers and 10,355 Iraqis had been killed. Several insurgency groups and heads of Sunni Muslim tribes also formed a coalition called the Mujahideen Shura Council.

By late 2007, violent and indiscriminate attacks directed by AQI against Iraqi civilians had severely damaged their image and caused the loss of support among the population, isolating the group. In a major blow to AQI, thousands of former Sunni militants that previously fought along with the group started to actively fight AQI and also work with the American and Iraqi forces, starting with the creation of the Anbar Awakening Council, so called because of its Anbar origins. The group spread to all Sunni cities and communities and some Shiite areas and adopted the broader name Sons of Iraq. The Sons of Iraq was instrumental in giving tips to coalition forces about weapons caches and militants resulting in the destruction of over 2,500 weapons caches and over 800 militants being killed or captured. In addition, the 30,000 strong U.S. troop surge supplied military planners with more manpower for operations targeting Al-Qaeda in Iraq, The Mujahadeen Shura Council, Ansar Al-Sunnah and other terrorist groups. The resulting events led to dozens of high-level AQI leaders being captured or killed. Al-Qaeda seemed to have lost its foothold in Iraq and appeared to be severely crippled due to its lack of vast weapons caches, leaders, safe havens, and Iraqis willing to support them. Accordingly, the bounty issued for Abu Ayyub-al-Masri, aka Abu Hamza al-Muhajer was eventually cut from $5 million down to a mere $100,000 in April 2008.

On January 8 and 28, 2008, Iraqi and U.S. forces launched Operation Phantom Phoenix and the Nineveh campaign (aka the Mosul Campaign) killing and capturing over 4,600 militants, and locating and destroying over 3,000 weapons caches, effectively leaving AQI with one last major insurgent stronghold—Diyala. On July 29, 2008, Iraqi, U.S. and Sons Of Iraq forces launched Operation Augurs of Prosperity in Diyala Governorate and surrounding areas to clear AQI out of its last stronghold. Two operations had already been launched in Diyala with mixed results, and this campaign was expected to face fierce resistance. The resulting operation left over 500 weapons caches destroyed and five militants killed; 483 militants were captured due to the lack of resistance from the insurgent forces. Twenty four high-level AQI terrorists were killed or captured in the campaign.

Writings
Kalimāt mudī'a (Enlightening Speech in English) is a more than 600-page compilation of al-Zarqawi's writings and transcribed speeches.

See also
 Abdel Majid al-Majali

Citations

General bibliography

External links

 

 Articles
 'How the Zarqawi myth was made in America', Nick Davies
 Zarqawi: Taking Care of Business, Daniel Ross, August 1, 2006
 "Al-Zarqawi: A life drenched in blood", Patrick Cockburn, The Independent, June 9, 2006

1966 births
2006 deaths
20th-century criminals
21st-century criminals
Assassinated al-Qaeda leaders
Critics of Shia Islam
Deaths by American airstrikes
Filmed assassinations
Fugitives
Salafi jihadists
Fugitives wanted by Iraq
Iraqi insurgency (2003–2011)
Islamic State of Iraq and the Levant
Jordanian al-Qaeda members
Jordanian expatriates in Afghanistan
Jordanian expatriates in Pakistan
Jordanian prisoners and detainees
Leaders of Islamic terror groups
Members of al-Qaeda in Iraq
2000 millennium attack plots
People from Zarqa
Jordanian Qutbists
People sentenced to death in absentia
Prisoners and detainees of Jordan
Terrorism in Iraq